Ziri may refer to:
 Ziri, East Azerbaijan, Iran
 Ziri, Kerman, Iran
 Žiri, Slovenia